Misfortune or Misfortunes may refer to:

Bad luck

Books
Misfortune (folk tale) (Italian: "Sfortuna"), an Italian fairy tale collected by Italo Calvino in his Italian Folktales
Misfortune (novel), a 2005 novel by Wesley Stace
A Misfortune, sometimes translated "Misfortune", an 1886 short story by Anton Chekhov 
Misfortunes, a 1930 poetry collection poems by Rose Macaulay

Music

Albums
Misfortunes (album), a 2008 album by This Is Hell

Songs
"Misfortune", a 1984 song by SNFU from ...And No One Else Wanted to Play
"Misfortune", a 1989 song by Goo Goo Dolls from Jed (song)
"Misfortunes", a 1992 song by And Also the Trees from Farewell to the Shade

See also
The Misfortunes of Arthur, play 1587
The Misfortunes of Alonso Ramírez 1690
The Misfortunes of Elphin, by Thomas Love Peacock 1829
 Bad luck (disambiguation)
 Fortune (disambiguation)
 Miss Fortune (disambiguation)